ISO 37120 Sustainable development of communities -- Indicators for city services and quality of life establishes and defines the methodologies for a set of indicators to measure and steer the performance of city services and quality of life.

History
The standard was developed by ISO/TC 268, which started work in the year 2012. The first edition of ISO 37120 was published in May 2014. Currently, the Toronto-based World Council on City Data is working globally to certify cities under ISO 37120.

Main requirements of the standard 
The ISO 37120:2018 adopts the structure in the following breakdown:

 1 Scope
 2 Normative references
 3 Terms and definitions
 4 City indicators
 5 Economy
 6 Education
 7 Energy
 8 Environment and Climate change
 9 Finance
 10 Governance
 11 Health
 12 Housing
 13 Population and Social conditions
 14 Recreation
 15 Safety
 16 Solid waste
 17 Sports and Culture
 18 Telecommunication
 19 Transport
 20 Urban/local agriculture and Food security
 21 Urban planning
 22 Wastewater
 23 Water
 24 Reporting and record maintenance

Edition

See also 
 Quality management system
 List of ISO standards
 Conformity assessment
 International Organization for Standardization

References

External links 
  ISO 37120—Sustainable development of communities—Indicators for city services and quality of life
 ISO/TC 286—Sustainable cities and communities

37120